Caroline Helmersson-Olsson (born 1963) is a Swedish social democratic politician. She has been a member of the Riksdag since 2007.

References

External links
Caroline Helmersson Olsson at the Riksdag website

Living people
1963 births
Women members of the Riksdag
21st-century Swedish women politicians
Members of the Riksdag from the Social Democrats
Members of the Riksdag 2006–2010
Members of the Riksdag 2010–2014
Members of the Riksdag 2014–2018
Members of the Riksdag 2018–2022
Members of the Riksdag 2022–2026